A. G. Kulkarni (1 March 1917 - 27 April 1992) was an Indian politician, a member of the Indian National Congress.

Early life 
He was born in Maharashtra. He obtained a Bachelor of Science in Chemistry.

Career 
He was Member of Rajya Sabha for four terms: April 19, 1967 to April 2, 1970, April 3, 1970 to April 2, 1976, April 3, 1978 to April 2, 1984, and July 5, 1986 to April 27, 1992. During 1978-82 he was Vice-Chairman of Rajya Sabha.

Legacy 
He is survived by Shrimati Malati Kulkarni Doogar, one daughter and four sons.

References 

1917 births
1992 deaths
Rajya Sabha members from Maharashtra
Marathi politicians
Indian National Congress politicians from Maharashtra